Sentinel Buttress is a prominent crag containing a volcanic breccia sequence, rising to 535 m east of Palisade Nunatak at the head of Rohss Bay, James Ross Island. So named by the United Kingdom Antarctic Place-Names Committee (UK-APC) in 1987 from its commanding position in the area.

Cliffs of James Ross Island